Rasmus Hardiker (born 31 January 1985) is a British actor, best known for voicing Scott and Alan Tracy in the reboot animated television series Thunderbirds Are Go. He played Raymond in Steve Coogan's sitcom Saxondale and Ben in the Jack Dee comedy Lead Balloon. Hardiker was also in the BBC3 sketch series The Wrong Door.

He joined the voice cast of Thomas & Friends, voicing several characters in the UK and USA versions. He is also known for voicing Alfur from Hilda.

Early life
Hardiker was born in Sutton Coldfield, Birmingham, England. He left Arthur Terry School in Sutton Coldfield with an A level in drama.

Career

At the age of 20, he started his acting career as he played the role of Philip Chase in the miniseries The Rotters' Club (2005).

He made guest appearances in Shakespeare Re-Told, The Bill, Doctors, New Tricks, Black Mirror and Afterlife.

From 2006 to 2007, Hardiker played Raymond in the television series Saxondale, featuring Steve Coogan. He also played Ben in Lead Balloon, from 2006 to 2011.

From 2015 to 2020, he provided the voices of Scott and Alan Tracy in the reboot animated television series Thunderbirds Are Go. He then joined the voice cast of Thomas & Friends, where he voices Philip (UK/US), Monty (UK) and the Troublesome Trucks. He also took over for Jonathan Broadbent as the voice of Bill, starting with the twenty-second series.

Filmography

Film

Television

Video games

References

External links

SundayMercury.net – "Rasmus Hardiker: The Big Interview"
British Sitcom Guide – Interview

1985 births
English male film actors
English male radio actors
English male television actors
English male voice actors
Living people
People from Sutton Coldfield
Male actors from Birmingham, West Midlands
21st-century English male actors
English people of Danish descent